Dean Timmins (born 11 August 1986 in Wolverhampton, England) is an English-Australian former figure skater. He represented Australia in men's singles. He placed fourth at the 2007 Australian national championships and competed at the 2007 Four Continents Championships, where he placed 20th.

Competitive highlights

References

External links

 

Australian male single skaters
Living people
1986 births